The 2013 Thüringen Rundfahrt der Frauen is the 26th edition of the Thüringen Rundfahrt der Frauen, a women's cycling stage race in Germany. It is rated by the UCI as a category 2.1 race and is held between 15 and 21 July 2013.

Stages

Stage 1
15 July 2013 – Schleusingen to Schleusingen, 
Linda Villumsen rode away from the bunch in the final , got a 35-second lead but was pulled back by the pack 500m from the finish. Emma Johansson won the uphill finale ahead of Lizzie Armitstead and Annemiek van Vleuten. With the bonification seconds earned during sprints Johansson has a six-second lead on Van Vleuten and a nine-second lead on Armitstead.

Stage 2
16 July 2013 – Hermsdorf to Hermsdorf, 
Chloe McConville and Anna-Bianca Schnitzmeier rode away together during the stage and build up a 3' 35" lead. After a 40 km breakaway they were caught by the pack with 10 km to go. In the final kilometres there was a crash and Dutch national time trialist Ellen van Dijk, one of the favourites for the ovarall classification, lost 55 seconds. The race ended in a bunch sprint won by  rider Carmen Small. With earning time bonuses during sprints, Emma Johansson extended her lead in the general classification.

Stage 3
17 July 2013, – Schleiz to Schleiz, 
In the first part of the stage every breakaway was pulled back by the pack. On the first climb Andrea Braus escaped and built up a seven minutes lead. With  to go however, she was pulled back by a 24 riders leading group but earned the most active riders jersey and moved up to the second place in the mountain classification.

Stage 4
18 July 2013 – Gera to Gera (individual time trial),

Stage 5
19 July 2013 – Altenburg to Altenburg,

Stage 6
20 July 2013 – Schmölln to Schmölln,

Stage 7
21 July 2013 – Zeulenroda-Triebes to Zeulenroda-Triebes,

Classification leadership

See also

 2009 Thüringen Rundfahrt der Frauen
 2013 in women's road cycling

References

External links

Thuringen Rundfahrt der Frauen
Thüringen Rundfahrt der Frauen
Thuringen Rundfahrt der Frauen